The .308 Winchester is a smokeless powder rimless bottlenecked rifle cartridge widely used for hunting, target shooting, police, military, and personal protection applications globally. It is similar but not identical to the 7.62×51mm NATO cartridge.

History
During the 1940s, the .300 Savage became the basis for experiments on behalf of the U.S. military that resulted in the development of the T65 series of experimental cartridges. The original experimental case design by the Frankford Arsenal was designated the T65 and was similar to the .300 Savage case, but with less taper. The experimental cases were made from standard .30-06 Springfield cases which gave a little less capacity than standard .300 Savage cases because the Frankford Arsenal cases had slightly thicker case walls. The later T65 iterations were lengthened compared to the original T65 case and provided a ballistic performance roughly equal to the U.S. military .30-06 Springfield service cartridge. Over forty years of technical progress in the field of propellants allowed for similar service cartridge performance from a significantly shorter, smaller case with less case capacity.

Winchester saw a market for a civilian model of the late T65 series designs and introduced it in 1952, two years prior to the NATO adoption of the T65E5 experimental cartridge iteration under the 7.62×51mm NATO designation in 1954. Winchester branded the cartridge and introduced it to the commercial hunting market as the .308 Winchester. Winchester's Model 70, Model 88 and Model 100 rifles were subsequently chambered for the new cartridge. Since then, the .308 Winchester has become the most popular short-action, big-game hunting cartridge worldwide. It is also commonly used for hunting, target shooting, metallic silhouette, bench rest target shooting, Palma shooting, metal matches, military sniping, and police sharpshooting. The relatively short case makes the .308 Winchester especially well-adapted for short-action rifles. When loaded with a bullet that expands, tumbles, or fragments in tissue, this cartridge is capable of high terminal performance.

Cartridge dimensions
The .308 Winchester has 3.64 ml (56.0 grains) cartridge case capacity. The exterior shape of the case was designed to promote reliable case feeding and extraction in bolt-action rifles and machine guns alike, under extreme conditions.

.308 Winchester maximum C.I.P. cartridge dimensions. All dimensions in millimeters (mm) and inches.

Americans would define the shoulder angle at alpha/2 = 20 degrees. The common rifling twist rate for this cartridge is 305 mm (1 in 12 in), 4 grooves, Ø lands = 7.62 mm, Ø grooves = 7.82 mm, land width = 4.47 mm and the primer type is large rifle.
A 254 mm (1 in 10 in) twist rate is also commonly applied.

According to the official C.I.P. (Commission internationale permanente pour l'épreuve des armes à feu portatives) rulings, the .308 Winchester can handle up to  Pmax piezo pressure. In C.I.P.-regulated countries, every rifle cartridge combo has to be proofed at 125% of this maximum C.I.P. pressure to certify for sale to consumers. This means that .308 Winchester chambered arms in C.I.P.-regulated countries are currently (2008) proof tested at  PE piezo pressure.

.308 Winchester vs. 7.62×51mm NATO
Although originating from an identical preceding series of experimental cartridges, the commercial 1952 .308 Winchester and the military 1954 7.62×51mm NATO chamberings have evolved separately and are not identical. The .308 Winchester and military 7.62×51mm NATO cartridges are similar enough that they can be loaded into rifles chambered for the other round, but the .308 Winchester cartridges are typically loaded to higher pressures than 7.62×51mm NATO service cartridges. Even though the Sporting Arms and Ammunition Manufacturers' Institute (SAAMI) does not consider it unsafe to fire the commercial .308 Winchester rounds in weapons chambered for the military 7.62×51mm NATO round, there is significant discussion about compatible chambers and pressures between the two cartridges based on powder loads, chamber dimensions and wall thicknesses in the web area of the military compared to commercial cartridge cases. As the chambers differ, accordingly the head space gauges used for the two chamberings differ.

Usage and performance
The .308 Winchester is considered the standard hunting cartridge in the United States. It has gained popularity in many countries as an exceptional cartridge for game in the medium- to large-sized class. Although in North America it is commonly thought that it is only recommended for whitetail deer, pronghorn and the occasional caribou or black bear, the .308 Winchester is among the calibers recommended for hunting brown and grizzly bears by the Alaska Department of Game and Fish.  Moreover, the Canadian Arctic Rangers chose the Colt Canada C19 in .308 Winchester/7.62×51mm NATO for "polar bear defense" in 2014; demonstrating that the .308 Winchester is suitable and even preferred for taking any medium, large or dangerous game located in the Americas.

Clay Harvey, an American gun writer, said the .308 Winchester is usable on moose and elk. Layne Simpson, an American who has hunted in Sweden, said he is surprised at how many hunters there used the cartridge. Craig Boddington was told by a Norma Precision executive that the .308 Winchester was one of Norma's best-selling calibers.

In Africa, the .308 Winchester is one of the most popular calibers among Bushveld hunters and is used on anything from duiker right up to the massive eland (a small and large African antelope respectively). Proponents of the hydrostatic shock theory contend that the .308 Winchester has sufficient energy to impart hydrostatic shock to living targets when rapidly expanding bullets deliver a high rate of energy transfer.

While .308 Winchester has traditionally been the most popular cartridge in the past, the development of lighter recoil chamberings with sufficient downrange energy, like the 7mm-08 Remington, .260 Remington, and 6.5 Creedmoor, is becoming more common for metallic silhouette shooting.

Palma shooting is a variant of full bore target shooting done with a bolt action rifle chambered in 7.62x51mm NATO/.308 Winchester firing match grade 155 grain bullets and using micrometer aperture iron sights out to 1,000 yards.

F-class is a variant of full-bore target rifle which permits optical telescopic sights and shooting rests at the front and rear, such as a bipod or bags. Competitions are fired at distances between 300 and 1,200 meters (or yards), and the targets are half the size of those used in traditional Palma shooting. Based on equipment, competitors can choose to compete in one of the two classes, open and standard:
F-TR ("target", standard class): A restricted class which permits a scope, bipod, backpack and rear bag (no front rest), the caliber has to be either .223 Remington or .308 Winchester. In addition, the weight limit including optics is 8.25 kg (18.15 lbs.).

The .308 Winchester has slightly more drop at long range than the .30-06 Springfield, owing to its slightly lower (around ) muzzle velocity with most bullet weights.  Cartridges with significantly higher muzzle velocities, such as the .300 Winchester Magnum can have significantly less drop at long range, but much higher recoil.

As a parent case

Several cartridges have been developed using the .308 Winchester as a parent case, some becoming very popular for hunting, particularly in North America. These are the .243 Winchester, the .260 Remington (6.5-08 A-Square), the 7 mm-08 Remington, the .338 Federal, and the .358 Winchester (8.8×51mm). In 1980, two rimmed cartridges based on the .308 Winchester were introduced for use in the Winchester Model 94 XTR Angle Eject rifle: the .307 Winchester and the .356 Winchester. In 2014, the rimless 45 Raptor was introduced to provide a big bore cartridge for the AR-10 by combining the .308 Winchester with the .460 S&W Magnum.

.243 Winchester
.260 Remington
7mm-08 Remington
7.62×51mm NATO
.307 Winchester
.338 Federal
.358 Winchester

See also 
 .30 Remington AR
 Delta L problem
 List of firearms
 List of rifle cartridges
 7mm caliber
 Table of handgun and rifle cartridges
 Sectional density

References

External links

 Ultra-high speed .308 photos  amateur high speed photography
 .308 Winchester Cartridge Guide by AccurateShooter.com
 .308 Videos by StoppingPower.Info
Watch load development of 308Win 308 load development at 600m by rifletalks.com

Pistol and rifle cartridges
Paramilitary cartridges
308